Jon R. Katzenbach is a published author and consultant who is best known for his work on the informal organization. He is a practitioner in organizational strategies for Strategy&. He is a managing director with PwC U.S., based in New York. He is also the founder of the Katzenbach Center at Strategy&, a center of excellence in the areas of organizational culture, leadership, informal organization and motivation.

Biography

Early life and education 
Katzenbach attended Brigham Young University and graduated with distinction from Stanford University in 1954 with a Bachelor of Arts degree in economics. He obtained his MBA from Harvard University in 1959 where he was a Baker Scholar.

Career 
Before founding Katzenbach Partners LLC, Katzenbach was a director with McKinsey & Company. Over more than 35 years at McKinsey, he led the firm’s San Francisco and New York offices and also served on many of the firm’s governance bodies. Specifically, he served as Chairman of several governance committees and was elected for multiple terms to the Shareholders’ Committee, the firm’s senior policy and governance body. While with McKinsey, Jon served executives of leading companies. He also served many public institutions, including Columbia-Presbyterian Hospital, the Columbia Business School Advisory Council, and was instrumental in launching both the New York City Partnership and Miami 2000.

Katzenbach also served in the Navy during the Korean War as a Lt (jg) in the Pacific on the USS Whetstone (LSD 27) and on the USS Nicholas (DDE 449).

Katzenbach has authored several leading articles and books, including Why Pride Matters More Than Money, Peak Performance, Teams at the Top, Real Change Leaders, The Myth of the Top Management Team, Firing Up the Front Line (with Jason A. Santamaria), The Discipline of Teams (with Douglas K. Smith) and the bestseller The Wisdom of Teams (also with Douglas K. Smith). Jon (with Booz & Company Partner Zia Khan) is currently writing The Informal Advantage, a book that discusses how leading organizations mobilize their informal organization to realize performance advantages.

Bibliography 
 The Wisdom of Teams: Creating the High-Performance Organization (1992)
 The Discipline of Teams: A Mindbook-Workbook for Delivering Small Group Performance (1993)
 Real Change Leaders: How You Can Create Growth and High Performance at Your Company (1995)
 Teams at the Top: Unleashing the Potential of Both Teams and Individual Leaders (1997)
 Peak Performance: Aligning the Hearts and Minds of Your Employees (2000)
 Why Pride Matters More Than Money (2003)
 Leading Outside the Lines: How to Mobilize the Informal Organization, Energize Your Team, and Get Better Results (2010)
 HBR's 10 Must Reads on Teams (2013)
 High-Performance Teams (2016)

Further reading 
 Katzenbach, Jon and Khan, Zia. "Money is Not the Best Motivator" Forbes.com, April 6, 2010
 Reingold, Jennifer and Yang, Jia Lynn. "Hidden Workplace" Fortune, July 23, 2007
 Goldsmith, Marshall and Katzenbach, Jon. “Navigating the ‘Informal’ Organization.” BusinessWeek, February 14, 2007
 Hammonds, Keith. "A Katzenbach Reader" Fast Company, April 1, 2005
 Hammonds, Keith. "Consultant, Heal Thyself" Fast Company, April 1, 2005
 Maruca, Regina Fazio. "What Makes Teams Work?" Fast Company, October 31, 2000

References

External links
Jon Katzenbach
 Katzenbach Center

Living people
McKinsey & Company people
Harvard Business School alumni
Brigham Young University alumni
Stanford University alumni
Year of birth missing (living people)